John Giannone is a sportscaster for the New York Rangers of the National Hockey League. He has worked for MSG Networks since 2002, mainly as a rinkside reporter and studio host. He has also done play-by-play, occasionally filling in for Sam Rosen.

References

Year of birth missing (living people)
Living people
American sports journalists
New York Rangers announcers